The 38M Toldi was a Hungarian light tank, developed on the basis of the Swedish Landsverk L-60. It was named after the 14th century Hungarian knight Miklós Toldi.

Development and production 
The Hungarian general staff wanted a modern light tank as soon as possible, after the domestically developed V-4 turned out to be too expensive by 1936 and work on it progressed slower than expected.

Meanwhile, the Swedish AB Landsverk finished its recent development, the Landsverk L-60 in October, and was looking for a customer to cover the costs. After a series of trials in 1937 with the V-4 and the Panzer I, the MÁVAG heavy industries decided to purchase the license of the L-60, with a prototype for further development.

The turret of the vehicle was then modified, making space for the radio and other devices, with a cupola being placed on top (since the L-60 was still unfinished and lacked in many necessary features). The original main armament, the 20 mm Madsen was also replaced initially by a 25 mm Bofors autocannon, and then by the 20 mm Solothurn anti-tank rifle, as it was already in service in the Hungarian army. The hull would then be changed on the front, upper sides, and rear, to riveted plates instead of welded for faster and easier production, with the original Scania-Vabis 1664 engine being replaced by the German Büssing L8V.

At first, 80 vehicles were ordered from MÁVAG, then an order for 110 more vehicles were placed in 1940. In total, 202 units were produced.

Variants 
 38M Toldi I (A20) - first variant armed with a 20 mm Solothurn anti-tank rifle, 80 made.
 42M Toldi II (B20) - variant with thicker front armour, 110 made.
 42M Toldi IIA (B40) - modification developed in 1942, armed with the 37/42M 40 mm gun and a larger turret - 80 tanks of earlier variant were rearmed this way.
 43M Toldi III (C40) - improved variant with thicker armor and schürzen plates. Only 12 made.
 43M Toldi Páncélvadász ('Toldi tank destroyer') - Toldi hull with a German 7.5 cm Pak 40 anti-tank gun in an open casemate. Only 1 prototype made.

Combat 

The Toldi tanks first saw action with the Hungarian Army in the 1941 invasion of Yugoslavia . These tanks were then mostly used against the USSR between 1941 and 1944. Because of their light armour, armament and good communications equipment, they were mostly used for reconnaissance. The design was effective against Soviet light tanks widespread during the early stages of Operation Barbarossa, such as the obsolete T-26 and BT-5. However it was totally inadequate against the Soviet T-34 medium tanks encountered during the later stages of the war on the Eastern Front.

Service history 
The Toldi entered Hungarian service in 1940. From 1942, the Toldi's were reassigned to reconnaissance, command and ambulance roles. 

Several Toldi tanks were captured by the USSR late in the war, two of them were transported to Kubinka for testing and are still preserved there.

A few Toldis were captured by the Romanians after the 1944 coup d'etat removed the Axis-aligned government. Their further fate is unknown.

Survivors 
Two known surviving 38M Toldi tanks (one Toldi I and one Toldi IIA) are preserved on display at the Kubinka Tank Museum.

Notes

References

External links 

 War Is Over - Russian Army Database

Light tanks of Hungary
World War II light tanks
Armoured fighting vehicles of Hungary
Military vehicles introduced in the 1930s
Tanks introduced in 1937